5592 Oshima, provisional designation , is a Veritasian asteroid from the outer regions of the asteroid belt, approximately  in diameter. It was discovered on 14 November 1990, by astronomers Kenzo Suzuki and Takeshi Urata at the Toyota Observatory, and later named after Japanese astronomer Yoshiaki Oshima. The carbonaceous C-type asteroid has a rotation period of 12.5 hours.

Orbit and classification 

Oshima is a core member of the Veritas family, a young family of carbonaceous asteroids, that formed approximately  million years ago. The family is named after 490 Veritas and consists of nearly 1,300 members. Other members of this family include 1086 Nata and 2934 Aristophanes.

This asteroid orbits the Sun in the outer main belt at a distance of 3.0–3.4 AU once every 5 years and 8 months (2,063 days; semi-major axis of 3.17 AU). Its orbit has an eccentricity of 0.07 and an inclination of 8° with respect to the ecliptic.

Physical characteristics 

Oshima has been characterized as a carbonaceous C-type asteroid by Pan-STARRS and in the SDSS-based taxonomy. The Small Solar System Objects Spectroscopic Survey (S3OS2) it is classified as a Caa and hydrated Ch-type in the survey's Tholen- and SMASS-like taxonomy, respectively.

Rotation period 

In September 2006, a rotational lightcurve of Oshima was obtained from photometric observations by French amateur astronomer Laurent Bernasconi. Lightcurve analysis gave a rotation period of  hours with a brightness amplitude of 0.28 magnitude.

Diameter and albedo 

According to the surveys carried out by the Infrared Astronomical Satellite IRAS, the Japanese Akari satellite and the NEOWISE mission of NASA's Wide-field Infrared Survey Explorer, Oshima measures between 22.657 and 30.47 kilometers in diameter and its surface has an albedo between 0.04 and 0.086.

The Collaborative Asteroid Lightcurve Link derives an albedo of 0.0479 and a diameter of 25.32 kilometers based on an absolute magnitude of 11.9.

Naming 

This minor planet was named by the second discoverer after Japanese astronomer Yoshiaki Oshima, a prolific discoverer of minor planets himself at the Gekko Observatory during the late 1990s. The official naming citation was published by the Minor Planet Center on 1 September 1993.

References

External links 
 Asteroid Lightcurve Database (LCDB), query form (info )
 Dictionary of Minor Planet Names, Google books
 Asteroids and comets rotation curves, CdR – Observatoire de Genève, Raoul Behrend
 Discovery Circumstances: Numbered Minor Planets (5001)-(10000) – Minor Planet Center
 
 

005592
Discoveries by Kenzo Suzuki (astronomer)
Discoveries by Takeshi Urata
Named minor planets
19901114